Brigador (originally titled Matador) is an isometric real-time tactical game from independent studio Stellar Jockeys, released on October 16, 2015 on early access. It officially left early access on June 2, 2016. The game has been compared to the Syndicate and MechWarrior series. Brigador: Up-Armored Edition, was the improved relaunch released on June 2, 2017, which provided a new introduction to game mechanics, rebalanced the game's overall difficulty, added localization support, and made graphical upgrades such as better explosions and lighting changes.

Gameplay
Brigador is divided into two modes: Campaign and Freelance. Each mission in Campaign mode offers the player up to four different loadouts to complete a mission's objectives. The player can choose from three main objectives: eliminate a certain number of enemy NPCs, take out all the marked captains, or destroy the orbital defense platforms before making their escape. Completing a mission successfully rewards the player with money, which they can spend on unlocking in-game flavor text as well as other vehicles, weapons and pilots for use in Freelance mode.

In Freelance mode, the player chooses a pilot, vehicle, weapons and a "run" of levels to complete. What the player chooses for their run will affect the difficulty of enemies faced, what factions they may encounter, as well as the payout multiplier bonus for successfully completing a run of levels. Additional, harder runs can be purchased using the currency earned within the game.

Development
Brigador is the first game by Stellar Jockeys. Co-founders Hugh Monahan and Jack Monahan are behind the game's art direction and design, while Dale Kim and Harry Hsiao worked as programmers on the game's custom engine. The game began development in 2011, and its development was entirely self-funded.  Brigador was released in October 2015 as an early access title, with the full launch following in June 2016. Following the 2016 launch, Dale Kim and Harry Hsiao parted amicably from the studio, with Karl Parakenings joining to provide programming support in their stead. On June 2, 2017, the game was relaunched as Brigador: Up-Armored Edition which added more content to the game, rebalanced the game's difficulty, and localized the game into several languages including French, German, Russian, Spanish, Chinese, Japanese, Korean and several others.

Reception

Brigador: Up-Armored Edition received "mixed or average reviews", according to review aggregator Metacritic. On initial release, the developers found it difficult to generate awareness for the game, which contributed to its commercial failure. However, due to the 2017 relaunch and continued support by the developers, the game saw improved sales numbers, particularly in non-English speaking territories.

Sequel
In May 2019, a direct sequel to Brigador, titled Brigador Killers, was announced.

References

External links
 Stellar Jockeys

2016 video games
Early access video games
Linux games
Video games about mecha
MacOS games
Real-time tactics video games
Science fiction video games
Single-player video games
Video games developed in the United States
Video games with isometric graphics
Windows games